William "Willie" Ferguson (6 March 1940, Johannesburg – 19 May 2007, Durban) was a racing driver from South Africa.  He entered the 1972 South African Grand Prix with local outfit Team Gunston, running a Brabham BT33, but could not start the race due to a blown engine in practice. He was also pencilled in to drive a Surtees TS9 for the same team, but that car was eventually raced by John Love. Ferguson participated in numerous non-Championship Formula One races.

Complete Formula One World Championship results
(key)

References
Profile at oldracingcars.com

South African people of British descent
South African Formula One drivers
South African racing drivers
South African people of Scottish descent
1940 births
2007 deaths
Team Gunston Formula One drivers
Sportspeople from Johannesburg